Mohammed Mouhouti (born February 8, 1972 in Morocco) is a retired footballer. He played in the Netherlands for various teams, spending six years in the Eerste Divisie with Heracles Almelo, and for Perth Glory in the Australian National Soccer League.

References
 Profile

1972 births
Living people
Moroccan footballers
Eerste Divisie players
National Soccer League (Australia) players
De Graafschap players
Go Ahead Eagles players
Heracles Almelo players
Perth Glory FC players
SBV Vitesse players
Association football midfielders